Trevor Geach (14 August 1928 – 18 June 1996) was a South African cricketer. He played in eleven first-class matches for Border from 1954/55 to 1956/57.

See also
 List of Border representative cricketers

References

External links
 

1928 births
1996 deaths
South African cricketers
Border cricketers